The Mabini Protected Landscape and Seascape, in Davao de Oro, Philippines, is a terrestrial and marine protected area established in 2000 to protect ecologically significant habitats in Davao Gulf. The park extends along the coast of the municipality of Mabini from the mouth of the Pandasan River to the southern tip of Kopiat Island. It also includes Lunod Island, also known as Pandasan Island, which was earlier declared a wilderness area in 1981.

Geography
The Mabini protected area is situated in the coastal villages of Cuambog, San Antonio, Pindasan, Cadunan and Tagnanan in the northeastern side of Davao Gulf, some 80 kilometers east of the regional capital Davao City. Its coast is characterized as generally flat and covered by San Miguel silty clay loam. It is lined by a good stand of mangrove forest, particularly along the shores of San Antonio and Pindasan. It is crossed by 9 rivers and creeks which drain into Davao Gulf, including the Lapinigan, Tagbalawlaw and Pindasan rivers.

The park also includes two small islands in Davao Gulf: the  Kopiat Island and the  Lunod Island. The islands contain stretches of white sand beaches with coconut and mangrove areas.   In Kopiat Island, a  lagoon can be found.  The waters surrounding the islands are known as a coral diversity hotspot hosting 46 of the 72 known genera of Scleractina found in the Philippines.

Visitor facilities are provided at Kopiat Island, including resorts and cottages with comfort rooms and dressing rooms.

Biodiversity
The Mabini portion of Davao Gulf is a feeding ground to 11 species of cetaceans such as sperm whales, killer whales and bottle-nosed dolphins. It also supports 5 marine turtle species including hawksbill turtles and leatherback turtles which lay their eggs on Kopiat Island.

Mangrove forests cover  of the park, dominated by the Rhizophora apiculata variety. It provides habitat to the following bird species:

 Olive-backed sunbird
 Little tern
 Gray wagtail
 Little slaty flycatcher
 Coleto
 Philippine glossy starling
 White-collared kingfisher
 River kingfisher
 Yellow-vented bulbul
 Brown shrike

 Little mangrove heron
 Zebra dove
 Pink-necked green pigeon
 Pygmy swiftlet
 White-rumped swift
 Philippine spine-tailed swift
 Ashy minivet
 Wandering whistling-duck
 Tree sparrow
 Olive-capped flowerpecker

References

Protected landscapes and seascapes of the Philippines
Geography of Davao de Oro
Protected areas established in 2000
2000 establishments in the Philippines